Osage Township is a township in Crawford County, Kansas, USA.  As of the 2010 census, its population was 686.

Geography
According to the USGS, it contains four cemeteries: Dumbald, Frog, Mc Cune and Mount Carmel.

References

 USGS Geographic Names Information System (GNIS)

External links
 City-Data.com

Townships in Crawford County, Kansas
Townships in Kansas